All Elite Wrestling (AEW) is an American professional wrestling promotion based in Jacksonville, Florida. It is considered the second largest wrestling promotion in the United States behind WWE.
AEW is owned by Shahid Khan and his son Tony, who founded the company in 2019; in-ring performers Matt & Nick Jackson and Kenny Omega also serve as company executives. Its headquarters are located at TIAA Bank Field, the home stadium of the National Football League's Jacksonville Jaguars, a team also owned by Shahid Khan.

Since October 2, 2019, AEW has produced a two-hour weekly television show, Dynamite, which airs live, with some exceptions. The show originally aired on TNT until December 2021; it moved to TNT's sister channel, TBS, on January 5, 2022. The company also has one other weekly television show, Rampage, which is a one-hour program that has aired on TNT since August 13, 2021. Additionally, AEW has two weekly YouTube-exclusive shows: Dark and Dark: Elevation. CBS Sports described AEW as "the first company with major financial backing to take a swing at beginning to compete with WWE on a major level in nearly two decades".

History

Background and formation

In May 2017, professional wrestling journalist Dave Meltzer made a comment that the American professional wrestling promotion Ring of Honor (ROH) could not sell 10,000 tickets for a wrestling event, a feat that no U.S.-based wrestling promotion besides the dominant WWE had accomplished since WWE's defunct major competitor, World Championship Wrestling, in 1999. The comment was responded to by professional wrestlers Cody Rhodes and The Young Bucks (the tag team of Matt Jackson and Nick Jackson), who were then top stars signed to ROH and good friends both inside and outside of professional wrestling as part of the group Bullet Club (and later part of the sub-Bullet Club faction, The Elite). They promoted and held an independent professional wrestling event called All In in September 2018, featuring wrestlers from ROH as well as other promotions. The event sold out in 30 minutes and had the largest audience in attendance for a professional wrestling show in the United States held and organized by promoters not affiliated with WWE or World Championship Wrestling (WCW) since 1993. The event was attended by 11,263 people. The event was acclaimed, and it led to much online speculation that Cody and The Young Bucks would expand their ambitions and create their own professional wrestling promotion or do a second All In event. Reportedly, people in the television industry were also very impressed with the show.

On November 5, 2018, several trademarks were filed in Jacksonville, Florida, that indicated the launch of All Elite Wrestling. Names filed for trademark included: All Elite Wrestling, AEW All Out, All Out, AEW, Double or Nothing, Tuesday Night Dynamite, AEW Double or Nothing, and several logos. In December 2018, Cody, The Young Bucks, and several other wrestlers left ROH. The official announcement of AEW's creation came at midnight Pacific Time on January 1, 2019, in an episode of Being the Elite, a YouTube web series created by and featuring The Elite. Also announced in the episode was Double or Nothing, AEW's inaugural event and sequel to All In.

On January 2, 2019, Cody and The Young Bucks officially signed with the promotion as competitors as well as serving as AEW's co-Executive Vice Presidents, while entrepreneur, football executive, and longtime wrestling fan Tony Khan was announced as the president of the company. Tony and his father, Shahid, were reportedly backing the promotion as lead investors. The Khans are billionaires and part of the ownership group of the Jacksonville Jaguars and Fulham F.C.

Cody's wife, Brandi Rhodes, was announced as the company's chief brand officer on January 3, 2019. On January 8, 2019, the company held its inaugural press conference on the forecourt of the TIAA Bank Field, where they announced talents that were going to perform as part of the promotion, including former ROH wrestlers the team of SoCal Uncensored (Christopher Daniels, Scorpio Sky, and Frankie Kazarian), "Hangman" Adam Page; independent wrestlers Dr. Britt Baker, Joey Janela, and former WWE wrestlers Pac and Chris Jericho.

On February 7, 2019, the group held a press conference where tickets were released for Double or Nothing. Other big announcements included Kenny Omega joining as a wrestler and the company's fourth co-Executive Vice President, as well as the signings of Lucha Brothers (Pentagón Jr. and Rey Fénix), Best Friends (Trent Beretta and Chuck Taylor).

Early history and TNT debut

On May 15, 2019, AEW and WarnerMedia announced a deal for a weekly prime-time show airing live on TNT, the network that formerly had broadcast WCW's Monday Nitro during the Monday Night Wars (1995–2001). CBS Sports describes AEW as "the first company with major financial backing to take a swing at beginning to compete with WWE on a major level in nearly two decades".

On May 25, 2019, AEW produced their first ever pay-per-view (PPV), Double or Nothing. It took place at the MGM Grand Garden Arena, and saw the debut of Jon Moxley. Also during Double or Nothing, pro wrestling veteran Bret Hart unveiled the AEW World Championship belt. During the summer, AEW produced two more events, Fyter Fest in June and Fight for the Fallen in July.

On August 31, 2019, AEW produced their second pay-per-view event, All Out.  At the event, the AEW Women's World Championship belt was unveiled and in the main event, Chris Jericho defeated Adam Page to become the inaugural AEW World Champion. On September 19, TNT's website listed AEW's show as AEW Dynamite, a one-hour preview show was also scheduled for October 1 at 8 PM. On October 2, Dynamite debuted on TNT which averaged 1.409 million viewers, which made it the largest television debut on TNT in five years. Also on October 2, WWE's NXT would make its two-hour debut on USA Network (the previous two episodes featured the first hour on USA with the second hour on the WWE Network), and they averaged 891,000 viewers. Dynamite beat out NXT in viewership and more than doubled its competition in the key adults 18-49 demographic, scoring 878,000 viewers compared to NXTs 414,000. This would also mark the beginning of the "Wednesday Night Wars". Prior to and after the episodes, untelevised matches were filmed to air on AEW Dark on the following Tuesdays (except before pay-per-view events, where the episodes air Fridays) on AEW's YouTube channel. On November 9, AEW produced their third pay-per-view event, Full Gear. In the main event, Jon Moxley defeated Kenny Omega in an unsanctioned Lights Out match.
 
On January 15, 2020, WarnerMedia and AEW announced a $175 million contract extension for Dynamite on TNT through 2023 and that AEW would be launching an upcoming second television weekly show, later revealed as AEW Rampage. On February 19, AEW reached a new media rights deal with German media company Sky Deutschland (which previously broadcast WWE and Impact Wrestling shows) to broadcast AEW pay-per-views on Sky Select Event.

AEW has a training facility known as the Nightmare Factory, which is owned by AEW wrestler/coach Q. T. Marshall, who also serves as head trainer.

Impact of the COVID-19 pandemic

As other sports cancellations and postponements were being announced in March 2020, AEW began to be impacted by the American onset of the COVID-19 pandemic. Following the suspension of the 2019-20 NBA season after two players tested positive from the virus, the March 18 episode of Dynamite was held without spectators from Daily's Place in Jacksonville, Florida. Double or Nothing was supposed to take place on May 23, but on April 8, the MGM Grand Garden Arena announced that they had canceled all events up through May 31 due to the pandemic. At that point, Nevada had been in a state of emergency since March 12, banning all public gatherings indefinitely. In response, AEW announced that Double or Nothing would still proceed as planned but from Daily's Place, as well as TIAA Bank Field stadium for the main event match.

On April 13, Florida Governor Ron DeSantis had deemed AEW, like WWE, an essential business critical to the state's economy, and had added an exception under the state's stay-at-home order for employees of a "professional sports and media production" that is closed to the public and has a national audience. In an interview on the AEW Unrestricted podcast, Tony Khan stated the pandemic has deprived AEW millions of dollars in revenue from live events.

On August 3, 2020, Jazwares released the first line of AEW action figures and toys.

AEW announced the return of ticketed fans to live events on August 20, following Centers for Disease Control and Prevention (CDC) guidelines including wearing masks, physical distancing, and temperature checks. Beginning with their August 27 episode of Dynamite, they allowed up to 10 percent capacity at Daily's Place and up to 15 percent capacity starting at All Out.

On November 10, 2020, the promotion announced AEW Games, the company's video game brand. AEW revealed that three games are in development; AEW Casino: Double or Nothing and AEW Elite GM for mobile devices, and AEW Fight Forever developed by former WWE 2K developer Yuke's.

For the Double or Nothing pay-per-view in May 2021, the venue was raised to full capacity, making it the first time AEW held an event with a capacity crowd since March 2020.

Return to live touring 
In May 2021, AEW announced that they would be returning to live touring, beginning with a special episode of Dynamite titled Road Rager on July 7 in Miami, in turn becoming the first major professional wrestling promotion to resume live touring during the COVID-19 pandemic. Road Rager was also the first in a four-week span of special Dynamite episodes called the "Welcome Back" tour, which continued with the two-part Fyter Fest on July 14 and 21 in Cedar Park and Garland, Texas, respectively, and then concluded with Fight for the Fallen on July 28 in Charlotte, North Carolina. In June, AEW announced that the September 22 episode of Dynamite would be another special episode titled Grand Slam and would be AEW's New York City debut, a city primarily known as home territory for WWE, as well as their first full event held in a stadium. The event would also become AEW's most attended event, with over 20,000 spectators.

On August 20, 2021, CM Punk joined AEW. It was Punk's comeback to professional wrestling after leaving WWE in 2014.

On August 27, 2021, it was revealed that Dark would begin being taped at its own set within Universal Studios Florida in Orlando at Soundstage 21.

On the March 2, 2022 episode of AEW Dynamite, Tony Khan announced that he had acquired professional wrestling promotion Ring of Honor (ROH) from Sinclair Broadcast Group.

In January 2023, AEW sold its broadcasting rights to streaming service DAZN in 42 territories in Europe and Central Asia.

On February 1, 2023, AEW announced that they would be expanding its live events schedule and would begin doing house shows, with its house show series titled AEW: House Rules. AEW's first House Rules event took place on March 18 at the Hobart Arena in Troy, Ohio. Prior to House Rules, AEW had only held one house show, titled The House Always Wins, which occurred at Daily's Place in Jacksonville on April 9, 2021.

Programming
On May 8, 2019, AEW reached a media rights deal with British media company ITV plc to broadcast AEW shows on ITV4 with pay-per-views being broadcast on ITV Box Office starting with Double or Nothing on May 25, 2019. However, after ITV Box Office ceased operations in January 2020, ITV no longer broadcasts AEW pay-per-views in the UK.

AEW releases a "Road to..." and "Countdown to..." series of videos on its official YouTube channel prior to Dynamite and pay-per-view events. The videos consist of interviews, video packages, and backstage segments. The series is used to hype pre-existing matches, as well as create new rivalries.

In November 2019, AEW announced Bash at the Beach, a nine-day series of events, featuring two episodes of Dynamite, including one aboard Chris Jericho's Rock 'N' Wrestling Rager at Sea. On February 19, 2020, AEW reached a media rights deal with German media company Sky Deutschland (owned by Comcast, WWE's United States broadcast partner, which previously broadcast WWE and Impact Wrestling shows) to broadcast AEW pay-per-views on Sky Select Event.

On January 22, 2021, TNT Africa announced that the channel would begin airing Dynamite on Friday nights in Sub-Saharan Africa. The show premiered on February 5, 2021.

In February, AEW announced their newest show AEW Dark: Elevation, which began airing on March 15. The show is uploaded to their YouTube channel on Mondays at 7 p.m. ET as a complement to AEW Dark.

On May 19, 2021, AEW announced that Dynamite would be moving to TBS in January 2022. In addition, AEW also announced that they would be launching a second weekly TV show called AEW Rampage, which would air on Fridays at 10 p.m. ET on TNT, beginning August 13. On August 2, AEW announced a deal with Discovery Inc. to air Dynamite and Rampage on Eurosport starting on August 15, 2021, in India. On February 10, 2022, Warner TV announced that they would be airing Dynamite and Rampage in Poland. On April 8, 2022, it was announced that as part of the AEW and NJPW working relationship, Dynamite and Rampage would air in Japan on NJPW World. On May 5, 2022, AEW announced that Dynamite and Rampage would air on TNT in Spain starting on June 17, 2022, and later live from June 19, 2022.

As part of the deal to move Dynamite to TBS, AEW agreed to produce quarterly television specials on TNT that would air on Saturdays at 8 p.m. ET. The series was titled AEW Battle of the Belts, with the first special airing on January 8, 2022. Beginning with the fourth special on October 7, 2022, Battle of the Belts was moved to Friday nights, airing immediately after Rampage at 11 p.m. ET to avoid potential counterprogramming, particularly against WWE's pay-per-views.

On the February 22, 2023, episode of Dynamite, Tony Khan and Adam Cole announced a new television program beginning on March 29 called AEW: All Access. It will be a reality television show about the lives of the promotion's wrestlers and will feature behind-the-scenes footage. The program will air immediately after Dynamite at 10 p.m. ET on TBS.

Broadcast

Online

Events

AEW pay-per-view events are available via MGM+ and Bleacher Report in the United States and Canada, and via FITE TV internationally. Additionally, AEW PPVs are also available via traditional PPV outlets in the United States and Canada and are carried by all major satellite providers.

Partnerships
AEW has partnership agreements with several promotions around the world. In early 2019, AEW struck two partnership deals with Mexican Lucha Libre AAA Worldwide (AAA) and Chinese Oriental Wrestling Entertainment (OWE) promotions. By late 2020 and going into 2021, AEW formed partnerships with other wrestling promotions. Tony Khan has dubbed the concept of wrestlers from other promotions appearing in AEW as going through "the forbidden door". In December of that year, AEW began a partnership with Impact Wrestling, which saw AEW World Champion Kenny Omega making appearances on Impact!. Omega would later make his in ring debut for Impact at Hard to Kill, and defeated Rich Swann to win the Impact World Championship at the Rebellion event, making him the first person to hold championships in both Impact and AEW concurrently. In October 2021, the working relationship between AEW and Impact Wrestling ended following Impact's Bound for Glory.

On February 3, 2021, at the Beach Break television special, AEW started a partnership with New Japan Pro-Wrestling (NJPW). After the main event, Kenta made his AEW debut and hit Jon Moxley with his finishing strike, the Go 2 Sleep. Kenta would later make his AEW in ring debut at the following Dynamite. Over one year later on the April 20, 2022 edition of Dynamite, it was announced that AEW and NJPW reached an agreement to co-produce a pay-per-view event titled AEW×NJPW: Forbidden Door, which took place at the United Center in Chicago on June 26.

On March 20, 2022, at DDT Pro-Wrestling's Judgement, it was announced that AEW had formed a working relationship with DDT and Tokyo Joshi Pro-Wrestling that would see wrestlers from both brands appear on AEW programming.

Contracts

AEW signs most of its talent to exclusive contracts, meaning talent can appear or perform only on AEW programming and events though it has partnerships with Japan's New Japan Pro-Wrestling (NJPW), DDT Pro-Wrestling (DDT), Tokyo Joshi Pro Wrestling (TJPW), Pro Wrestling Noah, Pro Wrestling Wave, and Mexico's Lucha Libre AAA Worldwide (AAA), wrestlers and other personalities from those promotions may also make periodic appearances at AEW events.

Video games

Championships and accomplishments

Current champions

References

External links

All Elite Wrestling
2019 establishments in Florida
American companies established in 2019
Companies based in Jacksonville, Florida
English-language YouTube channels
Entertainment companies of the United States
Entertainment-related YouTube channels
Shahid Khan
YouTube channels launched in 2019
Sports-related YouTube channels